Ernestine Grace Tiamzon (born May 4, 1997) is a Filipino-Canadian volleyball athlete. She is currently a varsity player of De La Salle University  collegiate women's volleyball team. She has also recently joined the semi-pro commercial league Philippine Super Liga under the F2 Logistics Cargo Movers club.

Personal life
Ernestine Tiamzon, also called as "Tin" or "Ernie" by her family and friends, can fluently speak both Filipino and English language. She was born in Koronadal, South Cotabato, Philippines where her family owns and manages a plantation of organically manufactured products registered under Kablon Farms Foods Corporation. Though purely Filipino, she was raised in Canada since she was 8 years old when her family migrated to Burnaby, British Columbia in 2006. She is the youngest of 5 siblings. Her sister, Aika Tiamzon-Billena, was also a former DLSU Lady Spiker. She is currently taking up Business Management degree at De La Salle University.

She was a former high school band member and can play musical instruments such as clarinet and ukulele.

Career
Tiamzon originally played basketball in high school. She eventually shifted to volleyball and played with the Moscrop Panthers in Moscrop Secondary School. Back in Canada, she was a member of a club team in Apex Volleyball U18. During her high school career in Canada she was grades 10 South Delta Tournament Most Valuable Player, grades 10 & 11 Invitational Most Valuable Player, grades 8-11 Allstar Awardee and grades 10 & 12 Provincial Allstar. She was also grade 11 second Allstar, grades 8-12 Burnaby/New West Banner champions, Grades 8 & 10 Vancouver & District champions and Grades 11 & 12 second placer (Lower Mainlands).

In February 2015, she was initially invited by DLSU team managers, Raffy Villavicencio and Eric Ongkauko, to join the training of the DLSU Lady Spikers conducted by head coach Ramil de Jesus. She left Canada in July 2015 to finally join and play for the DLSU Lady Spikers and take her scholarship slot at De La Salle University.

Short after arriving in the Philippines, she was assigned as the team's reserve player in the UAAP Season 78 Beach Volleyball tournament. On her first playing year in the University Athletic Association of the Philippines, their trio of seniors Kim Fajardo and Cyd Demecillo won the gold trophy in UAAP Beach Volleyball Championship, a first in La Salle's history.

During the UAAP Season 78 indoor volleyball tournament, she played as an Outside Hitter. They were able to win the golden trophy from their archrivals Ateneo Blue Eagles after 2 years of placing 1st runner-up.

On her sophomore year, Tiamzon served as the team captain in UAAP Season 79 Beach Volleyball tournament where her team-up with Desiree Cheng and Kim Fajardo brought DLSU to bronze finish. In UAAP Season 79 indoor volley, Ernestine has led DLSU's offense and was recognized as Player of the Game in few of the games of the season. In the Finals Series, the Lady Spikers emerged as back-to-back champions giving De La Salle University its 10th championship title in the league.

With F2 Logistics Cargo Movers, Tiamzon won the 2017 PSL Grand Prix Conference championship.

Awards

Collegiate

 2016 UAAP Season 78 volleyball tournaments -  Champion, with De La Salle Lady Spikers
 2017 UAAP Season 79 volleyball tournaments -  Champion, with De La Salle Lady Spikers
 2018 UAAP Season 80 volleyball tournaments -  Champion, with De La Salle Lady Spikers
 2019 UAAP Season 81 volleyball tournaments -  Bronze  medal, with De La Salle Lady Spikers
 2016 UAAP Season 78 beach volleyball tournaments -  Champion, with De La Salle Lady Spikers
 2017 UAAP Season 79 beach volleyball tournaments -  Bronze, with De La Salle Lady Spikers
 2018 UAAP Season 81 beach volleyball tournaments -  Silver, with De La Salle Lady Spikers
 2019 UAAP Season 82 beach volleyball tournaments -  Silver, with De La Salle Lady Spikers

Clubs
 2017 Philippine SuperLiga Grand Prix –  Champion, with F2 Logistics Cargo Movers

References

1997 births
Living people
Filipino women's volleyball players
Canadian women's volleyball players
University Athletic Association of the Philippines volleyball players
Sportspeople from South Cotabato
De La Salle University alumni
Outside hitters